The hand-in-waistcoat (also referred to as hand-inside-vest, hand-in-jacket, hand-held-in, or hidden hand) is a gesture commonly found in portraiture during the 18th and 19th centuries.  The pose appeared by the 1750s to indicate leadership in a calm and firm manner. The pose is most often associated with Napoleon Bonaparte due to its use in several portraits made by his artist, Jacques-Louis David, amongst them the 1812 painting Napoleon in His Study. The pose, thought of as being stately, was copied by other portrait painters across Europe and America. Most paintings and photographs show the right hand inserted into the waistcoat/jacket, but some sitters appear with the left hand inserted. The pose was also often seen in mid-nineteenth century photography.

Background
The pose traces back to classical times – Aeschines, founder of a rhetoric school, suggested that speaking with an arm outside one's chiton was bad manners. The pose was used in 18th-century British portraiture as a sign that the sitter was from the upper class. An early 18th-century guide on "genteel behavior" noted the pose denoted "manly boldness tempered with modesty." Art historian Arline Meyer has argued that – in addition to mirroring actual social behaviour or borrowing from classical statuary – the pose became a visualization of English national character in the post-Restoration period; in the context of increasing Anglo-French rivalry, the pose promoted "a natural, modest, and reticent image that was sanctioned by classical precedent" in contrast to "the gestural exuberance of the French rhetorical style with its Catholic and absolutist associations".

Appearance in photography
With the invention of photography, the pose continued but may have had an additional purpose in preventing blurring by maintaining the sitter's hand in a single place. The pose is commonly seen in photographs of members of the military, with a number of American Civil War photographs showing the pose, or indicated by three open buttons on a tunic.

Gallery

References

Portrait art
Hand gestures
Human positions
Cultural depictions of Napoleon